Two Eyes or two eyes may refer to:

two eyes
Two eyes, life and death in the game Go
Binocular vision

Music
2eyes Korean band

Albums
Two Eyes the third studio album by the American singer/songwriter Brenda Russell 
Two Eyes EP Pomegranates (band)

Songs
"Two Eyes" song by Brenda Russell composed by Brenda Russell from Two Eyes
"Two Eyes", song by Tommy Steele And The Steelmen on the "Butterfingers" EP,  Decca 1958
Two Eyes (Do Naina) single with Daler Mehndi Chris Constantinou 2007
"Dos Ojos" (Two eyes) Teen Angels